Wolffiella is a genus of aquatic plants commonly called duckweeds in the family Araceae. Common names for plants in this genus include bogmat and mud-midget. They are rootless and have a keel that allows them to maintain their orientation in the water.

Selected species
Wolffiella caudata
Wolffiella denticulata
Wolffiella gladiata
Wolffiella hyalina
Wolffiella lingulata
Wolffiella neotropica
Wolffiella oblonga
Wolffiella repanda
Wolffiella rotunda
Wolffiella welwitschii

References

Further reading
Bown, Deni (2000). Aroids: Plants of the Arum Family. Timber Press. .

Lemnoideae
Araceae genera